José Eduardo Gauggel Rivas (2 January 1954, in Santa Rosa de Copán – 10 April 2015, in San Pedro Sula) was a Honduran lawyer and politician who served as a member of the Supreme Court of Honduras from 1994 to 1998. He was the father of Eduardo Gauggel Medina, also a politician, who died alongside him in the same shooting.

References

1954 births
2015 deaths
Justices of the Supreme Court of Honduras
20th-century Honduran lawyers
People murdered in Honduras
Deaths by firearm in Honduras
Assassinated Honduran people
20th-century judges
21st-century Honduran lawyers
People from Santa Rosa de Copan